Humphrey Henchman (1592–1675) was a Church of England clergyman and bishop of London from 1663 to 1675.

Biography
He was born in Burton Latimer (or possibly nearby Barton Seagrove), Northamptonshire, the son of Thomas Henchman, a skinner, and educated at Christ's College, Cambridge, where he achieved BA in 1613 and MA in 1616. He became a fellow of Clare College, Cambridge, in 1617.

In 1630, he married Ellen Lowe, niece of John Davenant, who was Bishop of Salisbury from 1621 to 1641; along with these connections, his wife brought considerable property from her first marriage, which meant he lived in some comfort. They had three sons and two daughters who survived to adulthood; his grandson, another Humphrey, was a prominent lawyer who defended Henry Sacheverell in 1710 and helped draft the 1713 Treaty of Utrecht.

Career
Appointed canon of Salisbury Cathedral in 1623, his life was radically changed when the First English Civil War began in 1642 and he joined the Royalist forces. He was ejected from his position at Salisbury and his estates were confiscated. He helped the future Charles II to escape the country after the Battle of Worcester of 1651, and participated in Penruddock's Rising in 1655. On the Restoration of 1660, he was made Bishop of Salisbury – he was elected to the See on 4 October 1660, confirmed 23 October, and consecrated a bishop on 28 October – and in 1663 translated to be Bishop of London, where he saw both the Great Plague and the Great Fire.

He was made Privy Councillor and Almoner to the King. In March 1665 he was elected a Fellow of the Royal Society.

References

Sources

External links
http://www.museumoflondon.org.uk/English/EventsExhibitions/Special/LondonsBurning/People/150796/page1.htm

1592 births
1675 deaths
Bishops of London
Participants in the Savoy Conference
Fellows of the Royal Society
People from West Northamptonshire District
Burials at All Saints Church, Fulham
17th-century Church of England bishops